Charaxes odysseus is a butterfly in the family Nymphalidae. It is found on the island of São Tomé. The species was described by Otto Staudinger in 1892.

Description
The wingspan of the male is 75 mm and the female is 95 mm. The butterfly has a black wing with brown edges, white-brown dots at the end, white line in the middle and other white-brown dots on top. Seitz- Of this rare species only the female is known. It somewhat recalls the female of lucretius but is smaller, has short, obtuse tails to the hindwing and instead of the light marginal band on the hindwing a row of 6 white submarginal spots in cellules 2—7. The wings are dark umber-brown above, somewhat lighter at the base of the forewing, and have beyond the middle a narrow whitish discal band, more or less broken up into spots, two being placed in cellule 5 and two in cellule 6 of the hindwing; in the basal part of cellules 3—6 on the forewing there are also small light spots; forewing at the distal margin with light spots 
in cellules lb—3. One of the many species peculiar to the island of St. Thome.

Taxonomy
It is considered part of the Charaxes lucretius group.

References

Further reading
 Victor Gurney Logan Van Someren, 1971 Revisional notes on African Charaxes (Lepidoptera: Nymphalidae). Part VII. Bulletin of  the British Museum (Natural History) (Entomology) 181-226.

External links

Charaxes odysseus images at Consortium for the Barcode of Life

Butterflies described in 1892
odysseus
Invertebrates of São Tomé and Príncipe
Endemic fauna of São Tomé Island
Butterflies of Africa